The penal colony of Cayenne (French: Bagne de Cayenne), commonly known as Devil's Island (Île du Diable), was a French penal colony that operated for 100 years, from 1852 to 1952, and officially closed in 1953 in the Salvation Islands of French Guiana.

Opened in 1852, the Devil's Island system received convicts from the Prison of St-Laurent-du-Maroni, who had been deported from all parts of the Second French Empire. It was notorious both for the staff's harsh treatment of detainees and the tropical climate and diseases that contributed to high mortality. The prison system had a death rate of 75 per cent at its worst, and was finally closed down in 1953.

Devil's Island was also notorious for being used for the exile of French political prisoners, with the most famous being Captain Alfred Dreyfus, accused of spying for Germany. The Dreyfus affair was a scandal extending for several years in late 19th and early 20th century France, exposing antisemitism and corruption in the French military.

Organization
The prison system encompassed several locations, both on the mainland and in the off-shore Salvation Islands. Île Royale was the reception centre for the general population of the penal colony; they were housed in moderate freedom due to the difficulty of escape from the island. Saint-Joseph Island was the Reclusion, where inmates were sent to be punished by solitary confinement in silence and darkness, for attempted escapes or offences committed in the penal colony. Devil's Island was for political prisoners. In the 19th century; the most famous such prisoner was Captain Alfred Dreyfus.

Early penal system

Prisoners convicted of felonies in the 17th and 18th centuries were sentenced to serve as oarsmen in the French Mediterranean galley fleet. Given the harsh conditions, this was virtually a death sentence. Following the decommissioning of the Mediterranean galley fleet in 1666, the French detained the majority of prisoners in pairs, held in chains aboard galley hulks (bagnes) moored in French harbours, until the bagnes rotted and sank. The prisoners were transferred to live on the adjacent pontoons. Prisoners relied on charity or their families for food, bedding and clothing. They were required to work 12 hours a day in the docks, earning 10–15 centimes, which they could spend on food and wine. Other prisoners were housed in prisons onshore, but conditions were reportedly so bad that many prisoners would beg to be transferred to the hulks.

By the early 19th century, the French urban population had increased from under six million to over 16 million, and crime kept pace. In 1832 legislation was passed mandating the state's provision of basic necessities to prisoners. Prison reform changed the previous reliance on corporal punishment through hard labor, to imprisonment with a goal of punishment and deterrence. Imprisonment was considered a way to remove offenders from society. Recidivism of up to 75% had become a major problem; released and unemployed prisoners entered cities to seek a way to live.

In the 1840s, the state set up internal agricultural penal colonies as a place to receive prisoners, thereby removing them from urban environments and giving them work. Prisoners were commonly sentenced under doublage by which, on completion of their sentence, they were required to work as employees at the penal colony for an additional period equal to their original sentence.

The French Navy, which had been tasked with managing the prison hulks, complained strongly about the cost of guarding the hulks and the disruption they caused to the work of the shipyards. Following his coup in 1851, Emperor Napoleon III ordered that the hulks be permanently closed and that civil law convicts be transferred overseas to colonies. Debate over where the convicts would be sent was prolonged. Algeria was ruled out by the Navy as it was controlled by the French Army; Haiti, Cuba, the Dominican Republic, and Texas in the United States were considered, but the government eventually chose its own colony of French Guiana.

Since 1604 France had repeatedly failed to colonize French Guiana. The last attempt at colonization was in 1763. Some 75% of the 12,000 colonists who had been sent there died in their first year, often from tropical diseases. By the 1850s, the declining number of survivors were on the brink of extinction. In 1852, Napoleon called for volunteer prisoners from the hulks to transfer to the new Bagne de Cayenne (Cayennes penal colony) at French Guiana; 3,000 convicts applied. Two categories of prisoners were eligible for transportation: transportés, those civil-law prisoners sentenced under doublage, and déportés, prisoners convicted of political crimes, such as espionage or conspiracy. France also continued to use the hulks, housing an average of 5,400 prisoners at a time, until they were finally closed around the end of the 19th century. The agricultural penal colonies continued to be used for juveniles until the last was closed in 1939.

Use as penal colony
The islands were part of a penal colony from 1852 onward for French criminals: those convicted by juries rather than magistrates. The main part of the penal colony was a labor camp that stretched along the border with Dutch Guiana (present-day Suriname). This penal colony developed a reputation for harshness and brutality, and generated periodic calls for reform. Prisoner-on-prisoner violence was common; tropical diseases were rife. Only a small minority of broken survivors returned to France to tell how horrible it was; they sometimes scared other potential criminals to go straight.  This system was gradually phased out and closed completely in 1953.

Since the late 20th century, the islands have become tourist destinations with areas of the former prisons open for tours.

Devil's Island and associated prisons eventually became one of the most infamous prison systems in history. While the prison system was in use (1852–1952), inmates included political prisoners (such as 239 republicans who opposed Napoleon III's coup d'état in 1851) and the most hardened of thieves and murderers. The vast majority of the more than 80,000 prisoners sent to the Devil's Island prison system never returned to France.  Many died due to disease and harsh conditions. Sanitary systems were limited, and the region was mosquito-infested, with the insects transmitting endemic tropical diseases. The only exit from the island prisons was by water, and few convicts escaped.

Convicts who were lucky enough to have family or friends willing to send them money had to have it sent to them in care of a prison guard. The standard practice was for the guard to keep for himself a quarter of the amount sent and give the rest to the prisoner.

On 30 May 1854, France passed a new law of forced residency.  It required convicts to stay in French Guiana after completion of sentence for a time equal to their forced labour time. If the original sentence exceeded eight years, they were forced to stay as residents for the remainder of their lives and were provided land to settle on. In time, a variety of penal regimes emerged, as convicts were divided into categories according to the severity of their crimes and the terms of their imprisonment or "forced residence" regime.

An 1885 law provided for repeat offenders for minor crimes to be sent to the French Guiana prison system, previously reserved for serious offenders and political prisoners. A limited number of convicted women were also sent to French Guiana, with the intent that they marry freed male inmates to aid in settlement and development of the colony. As the results were poor, the government discontinued the practice in 1907. On Devil's Island itself, the small prison facility did not usually house more than 12 persons.

The horrors of the penal settlement were publicized during the Dreyfus affair, as the French army captain Alfred Dreyfus was unjustly convicted of treason and sent to Devil's Island on 5 January 1895. In 1938 the penal system was strongly criticized in René Belbenoît's book Dry Guillotine.

Shortly after the release of Belbenoît's book, which aroused public outrage about the conditions, the French government announced plans to close the bagne de Cayennes. The outbreak of World War II delayed this operation but, from 1946 until 1953, one by one the prisons were closed. The Devil's Island facility was the last to be closed.

The cable car system that provided access to Devil's Island from Royale Island deteriorated and Devil's Island is now closed to public access.  It can be viewed from off shore by use of charter boats. The two larger islands in the Salut island group are open to the public, with some of the old prison buildings restored as museums. They have become tourist destinations.

Fifteen women to camp
Around the middle of the 19th century, an experiment was carried out in which 15 prostitutes were brought to Devil's Island, who were thought to encourage prisoners to live a dignified life and start a family. The women were guarded by nuns. No families were born, but the women offered sexual favors to anyone who could offer them rum. Disputes arose among the men, and eventually a syphilis epidemic raged on the island.

Alleged and successful escapes

Charles DeRudio
After an attempt on 14 January 1858, to assassinate Emperor Napoleon III, Charles DeRudio was sentenced to life imprisonment on Devil's Island. He escaped with twelve others, making their way to British Guiana. In later life he joined the American Army and survived the Battle of the Little Bighorn.

Clément Duval
Clément Duval, an anarchist, was sent to Devil's Island in 1886. Originally sentenced to death, he later received a commuted sentence of hard labour for life. He escaped in April 1901 and fled to New York City, where he remained for the rest of his life. He eventually wrote a book about his imprisonment called Revolte.

François Frean, Paul Renuci, Raymond Vaude, and Giovanni Batistoti
Four escapees from Devil's Island arrived in St. Thomas, U.S. Virgin Islands on 18 October 1936. Their native boat was nearly wrecked on the reef and the convicts were initially entertained as guests and treated for injuries at the Municipal Hospital. The fugitives, François Frean, 37, Paul Renuci, 32, Raymond Vaude, 35, all French, and Giovanni Batistoti, 35, Italian, were reported to have suffered hardships.

Henri Charrière and Sylvain
Henri Charrière's bestselling book Papillon (1969) describes his successful escape from Devil's Island, with a companion, Sylvain. They used two sacks filled with coconuts to act as lifeboats. According to Charrière, the two men leaped into heavy seas from a cliff and drifted to the mainland over a period of three days. Sylvain died in quicksand a short distance from the shore. From there, Charrière was to meet a man by the name of Cuic-Cuic who would help him continue and complete his escape to freedom; instead Charrière was caught again and served for a time in the Bagne at El Dorado, Venezuela. Once finally freed, he remained in Venezuela.

Charrière's account aroused considerable controversy. French authorities disputed it and released penal colony records that contradicted his account. Charrière had never been imprisoned on Devil's Island. He had escaped from a mainland prison. French journalists or prison authorities disputed other elements of his book and said that he had invented many incidents or appropriated experiences of other prisoners. Critics said he should have admitted his book was fiction.

Felix Milani
Felix Milani travelled on the same ship over as Henri Charrière and wrote a book about his experiences titled The Convict.

René Belbenoît
René Belbenoît is perhaps the most renowned escapee of the penal colony, who wrote about his experiences in two well-received memoirs: Hell on Trial (1940) and  The Dry Guillotine: Fifteen Years Among the Living Dead (1938). After leaving the colony with temporary permission in 1930, he eventually made his way to the Panama Canal where he worked for nearly a year. In late 1930, he decided to return to France to argue for his freedom. However, it was a crime for a Devil's Island convict to return to France. He was sent back to French Guiana in 1931 to the prison colony. This time he was sent to Île Royale rather than Devil's Island. He was put into solitary confinement for almost one year. In 1934, he was again released, but as a libéré, or free prisoner, he was, as before in 1930, not allowed to return to France. He eventually made his way to the United States. He gained US citizenship in 1956. He died in California in 1959, age 59.

Francis Lagrange
Francis Lagrange was a painter and forger who wrote a book about his experiences on Devil's Island.

Bernard Carnot 
According to the second memoir of American sailor and writer William Willis (Damned and Damned Again), a few days after New Years in 1938, he rented a room in New York City from a French immigrant named Madame Carnot. Her son, Bernard Carnot, had been sent to Devil's Island in 1922 for a murder that he did not commit, and the Carnot family had since moved to the United States. Out of compassion and a sense of adventure, Willis set out to the penal colony to effect Bernard Carnot's escape, which he eventually accomplished. The subtitle of the book indicates that it documents the 'true story of the last escape from Devil's Island'.

Having been smuggled to Brazil aboard a supply ship, Carnot would never reunite with his family, although they learned via Willis that he had gained his freedom. On the outbreak of WW2 he returned to Europe and joined the French forces. He is believed to have been killed in action shortly before the liberation of Strasbourg.

Aftermath

In 1938, the French government stopped sending prisoners to Devil's Island. In 1953, the prison system was finally closed entirely.
Most of the prisoners at the time were repatriated to metropolitan France by the Salvation Army. Some chose to stay and resettle in French Guiana.

In 1965, the French government transferred responsibility for most of the islands to its newly founded Guiana Space Centre. The islands are under the trajectory of the space rockets launched from the Centre eastward, toward the sea (to geostationary orbit). They must be evacuated during each launch. The islands host a variety of measurement apparatus for space launches.

The CNES space agency, in association with other agencies, has restored buildings that are classified as historical monuments. Since the addition of tourism facilities, the islands now receive more than 50,000 tourists each year.

In popular culture 

In the 1925 American film The Phantom of the Opera, starring Lon Chaney, the Phantom is said to have escaped Devil's Island.
Devil's Island is featured in the plot of The Dain Curse (1928), a novel by Dashiell Hammett, an American mystery writer.
Danish writer Aage Krarup Nielsen wrote a novel Helvede hinsides havet (1933) (Hell beyond the Sea), describing life in the prison system.
In 1939, Boris Karloff was cast as Dr. Charles Gaudet in the American film Devil's Island.
Director Frank Borzage's 1940 film Strange Cargo stars Clark Gable, Joan Crawford, Ian Hunter, and Albert Dekker as three convicts and a woman who escape from Devil's Island; they are led by Hunter's character, a possible personification of God. Peter Lorre also stars, playing a bounty hunter pursuing the others.
In the American film To Have and Have Not (1944), Paul de Bursac (Walter Surovy) tells Harry Morgan (Humphrey Bogart): "Did you ever hear of Pierre Villemars?  .... He's on Devil's Island, they sent me here to get him, to bring him back here to Martinique."
We're No Angels is a 1955 American movie directed by Michael Curtiz which starred Humphrey Bogart, Aldo Ray, and Peter Ustinov as escapees from Devil's Island.
The season 2, episode 8 of The Wild Wild West (first broadcast on 4 November 1966) takes place on Devil's Island.
Episode 9 of The Time Tunnel (first broadcast on 11 November 1966), titled "Devil's Island", was set on Devil's Island.
Henri Charrière's memoir, Papillon (1969), ostensibly described the extreme brutality of the penal colony. He claimed to be an escaped convict but was found never to have visited the island.  The book was adapted as an American movie of the same name; released in 1973, it starred Steve McQueen and Dustin Hoffman. A remake of Papillon was released in 2017, starring Charlie Hunnam and Rami Malek.
Argentine author Adolfo Bioy Casares's novella Plan de Evasion (A Plan for Escape, 1969), is set on Devil's Island. The novella tells of a French military officer sent to the archipelago and his interactions with the island's governor and staff.
In the fifth season of American TV series Frasier, episode 23, "Party, Party", Niles extols Seattle's exclusive Safari Club, saying "These are the people who introduced badminton to Devil's Island!"
Alexander Miles's 1988 history of Devil's Island, including an analysis of Charrière's "memoir" based on the records of the penal colony, show that most of the latter account did not happen, were embellishments, or were feats ascribed to others. Although prisoners were not treated well, conditions were not as bad as in Charrière's account.
In the 2003 episode "Bend Her" of the animated comedy Futurama, Devil's Island has independently entered the 3004 Olympics; its athletes appear to be wearing striped prison uniforms.
"Devils Island" is the title of a song by the band Megadeth on their 1986 album Peace Sells... but Who's Buying? The song expresses the thoughts of a prisoner on Devil's Island about to be executed.
Devil's Island has one full episode of Dave Salmoni's Deadly Islands series dedicated to it. Aired on Animal Planet (Discovery Channel Network) in 2015, the episode documents Salmoni's exploration of the island together with talk of its flora & fauna, dangers, and past as host to a network of penitentiaries.
The life of Vere St. Leger Goold is the subject of a 2012 Irish theatrical play called Love All. He was a top tennis player in the late 19th century who was convicted of murder and sentenced to Devil's Island. He committed suicide there.
Devil's Island is the title of a song by musical group CocoRosie, featured as a hidden track on the album Tales of a GrassWidow.
In Tour de Farce, a short film starring The Inspector, the title character accompanies a prisoner to Devil's Island.
William Willis's adventure on Devil's Island was featured in the Season 4 premiere of Drunk History on Comedy Central.
Devil's Island is mentioned in the plot of the 2015 sci-fi book Seveneves.
In Rob Zombie's 2022 movie The Munsters, Herman and Lilly vacation on the beach at Devil's Island Hotel. Herman wears a prison uniform that says Property of Devil's Island Penal Colony.

See also

 Charles DeRudio

References
Notes

Further reading
Belbenoit, René. 1940.  @#!*%  on Trial. Translated from the French by Preston Rambo. E. P Dutton & Co. Reprint by Blue Ribbon Books, New York, 1941.
Belbenoit, René. 1938. Dry Guillotine: Fifteen Years among the Living Dead. Reprint: Berkley (1975). . Reprint: Bantam Books, 1971.
W.E. Allison-Booth. 1931. Hell's Outpost: The True Story of Devil's Island By a Man Who Exiled Himself There. Minton, Balch & Company, 1931. 
Seaton, George John. Isle of the Damned: Twenty Years in the Penal Colony of French Guinea.  Farrar, Straus and Young, 1951.  Also published in England as Scars Are My Passport.
Charrière, Henry. Papillon. Reprints: Hart-Davis Macgibbon Ltd. 1970.  (hbk); Perennial, 2001.  (sbk).
Godfroy Marion, Bagnards, Tallandier, 2008.
Godfroy Marion, Bagnards, édition du chêne, 2002 (Ranked as "Best coffee table book of the year" by Le Monde).
CNES, Dossier de presse Îles du Salut 
Rickards, Colin. The Man From Devil's Island Peter Dawnay Ltd., London, 1968. Hardback
Nicol Smith, Black Martinique, Red Guiana, 1942.
Willis, William. 1959. Damned and Damned Again: The True Story of the Last Escape from Devil's Island. New York: St. Martin's Press.

External links

 "Devil's Island French Penal Colony", Salvation Army history
 

 
Cayenne
Dreyfus affair
Defunct prisons in French Guiana
19th century in French Guiana
Former penal colonies
20th century in French Guiana